Open Shading Language (OSL) is a shading language developed by Sony Pictures Imageworks for use in its Arnold Renderer. It is also supported by Illumination Research's 3Delight renderer, Otoy's Octane Render, V-Ray 3, Redshift (from April 2021), and the Cycles render engine in Blender (starting with Blender 2.65). OSL's surface and volume shaders define how surfaces or volumes scatter light in a way that allows for importance sampling; thus, it is well suited for physically based renderers that support ray tracing and global illumination.

In RenderMan, OSL is also an important module. It is modified there for better Intel AVX2 and AVX-512 advanced vector extension support with doubled performance. SIMD OSL is the product of this Development for Intel SIMD AVX2 and AVX-512 Hardware (Haswell and newer). AMD CPU Hardware with AVX2 support like Ryzen with Zen Architecture can also use this extension.

Release 1.12 supports C++14 as default, but also newer C++17 and C++20. OpenImageIO support will be dropped for 2.0 with support of 2.2. Minimum OpenEXR Version changes up to 2.3. SIMD Batch shader Mode and OptiX support are in development and experimental. CUDA 11 and OptiX 7.1 are here supported levels. 1.12.6 is supported in Blender 3.4. 1.12.6.2 is the first new release of the 1.12 series with a stable API. 1.12.10 is the current version.

Origin 
Larry Gritz explain origin of Open Shading Language:

Movies 

Many movies made in 2012 or later have used OSL, including:

 Men in Black 3 (2012)
 The Amazing Spider-Man (2012)
 Hotel Transylvania (2012)
 Edge of Tomorrow (2014)
 Ant-Man (2015)
 Finding Dory (2016)

2017 
 Lego Batman
 The Great Wall
 A Cure for Wellness
 Logan
 Power Rangers
 Life
 Smurfs: The Lost Village
 The Fate of the Furious
 Alien Covenant
 Guardians of the Galaxy 2
 The Mummy
 Wonder Woman
 Cars 3
 Baby Driver
 Spider-Man: Homecoming
 Dunkirk
 The Emoji Movie
 Detroit
 Kingsman: The Golden Circle
 Lego Ninjago Movie
 Blade Runner 2049
 Geostorm
 Coco
 Justice League
 Thor: Ragnarok

2018 
 Peter Rabbit
 Black Panther
 Annnihilation
 Red Sparrow
 Pacific Rim Uprising
 Avengers Infinity War
 Deadpool 2
 Incredibles 2
 Jurassic World: Fallen Kingdom
 Hotel Transylvania 3: Summer Vacation
 Ant Man and the Wasp
 Skyscraper
 Mission Impossible: Fallout
 The Meg
 Kin
 Smallfoot
 Alpha
 Venom
 First Man
 Bad Times at the El Royale
 Fantastic Beasts: The Crimes of Grindelwald
 Bohemian Rhapsody
 Holmes and Watson
 Spider-Man: Into the Spider-Verse

2019 
 The Kid Who Would Be King
 Alita: Battle Angel
 Lego Movie 2
 Lucky 13 (an episode of Love, Death & Robots)
 Captain Marvel
 Triple Frontier
 Avengers: Endgame
 Pokémon Detective Pikachu
 Godzilla: King of Monsters
 Rim of the World
 John Wick 3 Parabellum
 Men in Black International
 Toy Story 4
 Spider-Man: Far From Home
 Hobbs & Shaw
 Angry Birds 2
 The Art of Racing in the Rain
 Secret Life of Pets
 The Mandalorian (S1)
 The Dark Crystal: Age of Resistance
 The King
 Jumanji: The Next Level
 Richard Jewell
 Game of Thrones (S8)
 Lost in Space (S1)
 Togo

2020 
 Underwater
 Birds of Prey
 Onward
 Bloodshot
 Greyhound
 The Old Guard
 Mulan
 Tenet
 The New Mutants
 Artemis Fowl
 The Eight Hundred
 Over the Moon
 Wonder Woman 1984
 Soul
 The Mandalorian (S2)

2021 / upcoming 
 Chaos Walking
 Peter Rabbit 2: The Runaway
 The Falcon and the Winder Soldier
 Secret Magic Control Agency
 Zack Snyder's Justice League
 The Mitchells vs the Machines
 Jupiter's Legacy
 Luca
 F9

See also 
 Shading language
 3Delight
 Arnold Render Engine
 Blender
 Octane Render
 RenderMan

References

External links

Shading languages